The Holocaust in Bulgaria was the persecution of Jews between 1941 and 1944 in the Kingdom of Bulgaria and their deportation and annihilation in the Bulgarian-occupied regions of Yugoslavia and Greece during World War II, arranged by the Nazi Germany-allied government of Tsar Boris III and prime minister Bogdan Filov. The persecution began in 1941 with the passing of anti-Jewish legislation and culminated in March 1943 with the arrest and deportation of almost all11,343of the Jews living in Bulgarian-occupied regions of Northern Greece, Yugoslav Macedonia and Pirot. These were deported by the Bulgarian authorities and sent to extermination camps in German-occupied Poland.

The deportation of the 48,000 Jews from Bulgaria proper was subsequently initiated but halted following widespread protests. Upon becoming aware of the impending plans members of parliament led by Dimitar Peshev pressured the interior minister to revoke the initial deportation order, while public protests and interventions by prominent figures, notably Bulgarian Orthodox Church bishops Stefan of Sofia and Kiril of Plovdiv, persuaded the Tsar first to stop the deportation temporarily in March 1943, and two months later to postpone it indefinitely. The Jews whose deportation from Bulgaria was halted, including all Sofia's 25,743 Jews, were instead internally deported to the countryside and had their property confiscated, and Jewish males between the ages of 20 and 46 were conscripted into the Labour Corps until September 1944. The events that prevented the deportation to extermination camps of about 48,000 Jews in spring 1943 are termed the "Rescue of the Bulgarian Jews". The survival rate of the Jewish population in Bulgaria as a result was one of the highest in Axis Europe.

Background
In the period between the two world wars the Jewish community accounted for around 0.8% of the Bulgarian population, reaching approximately 48,000 people. More than half of them lived in the capital Sofia. Almost 90% of them were born in Bulgaria, 92% were Bulgarian citizens and their total share in the Bulgarian business and trade was 5.17%. The Bulgarian Jewish Community enjoyed excellent relations with the state as demonstrated in 1909 when grand opening of the impressive new Sofia Synagogue (the third largest in Europe) was attended by the Bulgarian royal family.
 
The 1930s saw the Bulgarian government under Tsar Boris III become increasingly economically dependent on Nazi Germany as it sought to break the country's international economic isolation and to counteract the Balkan Pact signed by all its neighbours. By 1939 almost 70% of Bulgaria's trade was with Germany. As a newly assertive Germany shook off the restrictions of the Treaty of Versailles and recovered its pre-WW1 territories its erstwhile WW1 ally Bulgaria similarly sought to repudiate the Treaty of Neuilly-sur-Seine and to recover territories lost in the war to Greece, Yugoslavia and Romania. The successful recovery of the vital Southern Dobrudja region from Romania in September 1940 following the personal intervention of Hitler further pushed Bulgaria in the German camp. With Germany poised to invade Greece and requiring transit through Bulgaria the country finally officially joined the Tripartite Pact in March 1941.

The influence of Nazi Germany became increasingly reflected in the political arena. A number of pro-fascist parties were founded in the 1930s, most notably the Union of Bulgarian National Legions; and the Union of Ratniks who attempted their own version of Kristallnacht in Sofia in 1939. These organizations published anti-Jewish propaganda, distributed brochures and copied Nazi racial documents. While none of these parties achieved a significant national following (the disruptive Ratniks were even banned by the Tsar in 1939) several pro-Nazi politicians were appointed to senior positions by the Tsar in 1939 to foster a closer relationship with Nazi Germany. Key figures were the Minister of the Interior Petar Gabrovski and his protege Alexander Belev, both virulent antisemites who eventually architected the country's anti-semitic laws and oversaw their implementation.

Anti-Jewish legislation 1940-1942
The beginning of World War II and the dependence of Bulgaria on a Nazi Germany that by now dominated most of Europe intensified the pressure to pass anti-Jewish legislation. German support for the rejoining of Southern Dobrudja to Bulgaria in September 1940 proved the tipping point. Within a month, on 8 October 1940, interior minister Petar Gabrovski introduced the parliamentary bill for the Law for the Protection of the Nation. The law was modelled on the Nuremberg Laws, which Alexander Belev had been sent to Germany to study by Gabrovski.

The Law for Protection of the Nation prohibited the granting of Bulgarian citizenship to Jews; it prohibited Jews from serving in a military capacity and mandated that they complete their national service in the Labour Corps.

The bill was opposed by the parliamentary opposition (Communists and non-Communists alike) notably by the ex-PM Nikola Mushanov and former cabinet ministers Dimo Kazasov, Yanko Sakazov, and Stoyan Kosturkov, as well as communist deputies.  The bill was endorsed by nationalist and far right groups such as the pro-Nazi Union of Bulgarian National Legions, the Ratniks, Brannik (a Bulgarian version of Nazi Germany's Hitlerjugend), and other right-wing conservative organisations such as the Federation of Reserve Officers, the Federation of Reserve Sergeants and Soldiers, the Merchants' Association, the Students' Union, the Bulgarian Youth League, and the Pharmacists' Association. It was also supported by leading delegate Dimitar Peshev, who later played a crucial role in saving Bulgarian Jews from deportation. 

The Law for Protection of the nation was passed and received royal assent in January 1941. Throughout 1941, members of Brannik and the "Insurgents" (Chetnitsi) indulged in random acts of violence against Jews.

Subsequent legislation continued the marginalisation. A one-time wealth tax of 1/5 to ¼ was imposed in July 1941 on the grounds of the Jews endangering the national economy. Jews who owned property were forced to offer it for sale to the State Land Fund, to Bulgarians or to Bulgarian companies at prices not exceeding 50% of the market value of the property as of 1932. 

The Commissariat for Jewish Affairs was founded in 1942, with Alexander Belev as director, which issued further policing measures against Jews such as mandatory wearing of yellow stars. This can be interpreted as the immediate precursor of the decision to deport Jews to extermination camps.

Deportations from the occupied territories
In April 1941 German forces invaded Greece and Yugoslavia from the territory of Bulgaria, defeating both countries in a matter of weeks. At a summit meeting on April 17 between King Boris III, Hitler and Count Ciano Bulgaria was granted responsibility for administering Greek east Macedonia and Western Thrace, plus the Yugoslav provinces of Vardar Macedonia and Pirot, territories Bulgaria had fought over in World War 1 and hoped to annex permanently. nother possibly fatal factor was the newly passed Law for Protection of the Nation, which meant that Jews in the newly acquired regions would be denied Bulgarian citizenship. From April 1941 to September-October 1944 the regions would be under Bulgarian administration.

In January 1942, Nazi Germany outlined what it called the Final Solution to the Jewish Question at the Wannsee Conference and the new Commissariat for Jewish Affairs began to prepare to execute Bulgaria's part in the Final Solution. Belev signed a secret agreement with Germany's SS-Hauptsturmführer Theodor Dannecker on 22 February 1943 to initially deport 20,000 Jews, starting with those in the occupied Greek and Yugoslav regions.

The deportation of 11,343 Jews (7,122 from Macedonia and 4,221 from Thrace) was organised and executed by the Bulgarian authorities, with the Treblinka extermination camp in Nazi-occupied Poland as their final destination. The Jews of Greek Eastern Macedonia and Thrace, Yugoslav Macedonia and Pirot began to be rounded up 4 March 1943. They were transported by train via transit camps in Bulgaria to Lom on the Danube, then by boat to Vienna, and again by train to Treblinka. The railway that carried the trains transporting Jewish deportees from Greece was constructed by Bulgarian Jewish forced labourers in the winter of late 1942 and early 1943. By 15 March, all but about a dozen of the Jews had been murdered at Treblinka.

Attempted deportations from Bulgaria proper and rescue

The Belev-Dannecker agreement signed on February 22, 1943 provisioned for 20,000 Jews from the "New Lands" to be deported. As there were only 12,000 Jews there the remaining 8,000 were to be collected from Old Bulgaria. The communities in Kyustendil and Plovdiv were targeted first, followed by Dupnitza, Gorna Dzhumaya and Pazardzhik. On March 2, the Council of Ministers adopted seven decrees concerning the deportation of Jews; the final decree was about the deportation of up to 20,000 Jews from the "newly-liberated territories" in cooperation with German authorities. According to the plan, activities began on March 4 in Thrace, on March 9 in the "old lands", and on March 11 in Macedonia. Action began in Kyustendil, where the local Jews were prepared for deportation in the Fernandes tobacco warehouse in accordance with the Bulgarian-German agreement. News about their imminent deportation was leaked, and efforts began to save them.

On March 9, 1943, a delegation from Kyustendil (Assen Switchmezov, Petar Mihalev, Ivan Momchilov and Vladimir Kurtev) arrived in Sofia to petition for the cancellation of the deportation and contacted National Assembly vice chairman Dimitar Peshev. That day, Peshev and 10 other MPs met with Interior Minister Petar Gabrovski twice, resulting in the deportation order being revoked. On March 17, Peshev and another 42 MPs filed a protest with Prime Minister Bogdan Filov against the deportation of Jews from Bulgaria.

On May 2, 1943, after Germany increased pressure on the Bulgarian authorities, the government prepared a second deportation campaign. This time, the plan included all 48,000 Bulgarian Jews. There were two different plans; Plan A called for the immediate deportation of all 48,000 Jews, and plan B mandated the relocation of all Jews from Sofia to the countryside. Boris III chose plan B. The Bulgarian public interpreted the expulsion of Sofia's Jews as the first step in their deportation from the country. On May 21, 1943, the government authorized the Commissariat of Jewish Affairs to move all "persons of Jewish origin" living in Sofia to villages and towns in the Bulgarian countryside except for those married to "persons of non-Jewish origin", baptized before July 29, 1942, or ill with a contagious disease.

Throughout the country, protesters threatened to block the Holocaust trains by lying on the railroad tracks. Ordinary citizens and religious leaders, including Bishop Kiril of Plovdiv, participated. Boris III was dissuaded from continuing the deportations and assigned Jews to forced-labour camps throughout the country, telling Adolf Eichmann and Adolf Hitler that Bulgaria needed them for railroad construction and other industrial work.

A May 24 protest in Sofia against the relocations was organized by about a thousand Jews and supported by other Bulgarians, including communists and Metropolitan Stefan of Sofia (who condemned government persecution of the Jews in a speech). The protest was dispersed by the police; 120 Jews were arrested and brought to the concentration camp in Somovit, and other activists were scattered throughout the country. Later that day, Metropolitan Stefan advocated for the Jews to Prime Minister Filov and tried to contact Boris III (who was away from Sofia) with his cabinet leader Pavel Gruev. Despite Commissar Alexander Belev’s efforts, he failed to deport all of Bulgaria's Jews from the country. On May 25, Jews in the larger cities began to be deported to work camps across Bulgaria. The deportation of Jews from Sofia began the following day, and 19,153 had left the capital by June 7.

Across the country, deported Jews were sheltered in the homes of local Jews or housed in empty schools. Their living conditions were difficult, but their survival was guaranteed. Deportation to Poland, the legal framework, was neither canceled nor implemented. Historians differ about who should receive the most credit for the rescue of the Bulgarian Jews: the Tsar, the church, the politicians who interfered, or the Bulgarian people. Resistance to the antisemitic policy indicated that antisemitism was foreign to Bulgarian society.

On 21 May 1943 the Council of Ministers voted that Jews were to be expelled from Sofia to the countryside in three days' time. The Metropolitan Stefan offered to baptise any Jews that sought the protection of the church; the Ministry of Religions decided it would not recognise such baptisms and would deport any Jews christened that year regardless. Stefan threatened to reveal this to all parish priests; in response the interior ministry ordered him to close all churches in Sofia. When he refused, the interior ministry sought his arrest, but Belev intervened to prevent action being taken against him. Belev ordered the expulsion on 24 May of Jews from the capital: 19,000 Sofia Jews (according to other sources25,743) were deported to specific rural areas and towns. Special trains were arranged and the Jews were assigned specific departures, separating family members. A maximum of 30 kg of property per person was allowed; the rest they were forced leave behind, to sell at "abusively low" prices, or which was otherwise pilfered or stolen. Bulgarian officials and neighbours benefited from the proceeds.

Although there was some internal political and social tension with regards to the treatment of the Jews, it didn't change the government policy towards the Jews. Inspired by Nazi German terminology, Bulgarian words meaning "internees" (internirani or vŭdvoreni) did not appear in official documents, with the Jews deported to the provinces referred to as out-going "resettlers" (izselnitsi).

Expressions of dissent grew as Bulgarians protested against any Jews being deported from Bulgarian soil, and the Bulgarian government was flooded with petitions from organisations of writers, artists, lawyers, and religious leaders, among others. Former Bulgarian diplomat and attorney Dr. Ivan Dimitrov Strogov was one of those who petitioned Tsar Boris III. His letter admonishing the government's decision to deport Bulgarian Jewry is one such that moved the Tsar to communicate his own change in perspective on the matter. Tsar Boris III was persuaded, after fierce and prolonged debate, to withdraw his decision to send Bulgarian Jews across the border. The anti-deportation effort was headed by Dimitar Peshev, deputy speaker of the legislature. Metropolitans Kiril and Stefan led the protest by the religious community.

Forced Labour 

Compulsory labour service (trudova povinnost) was initially instituted in Bulgaria in 1920 by the radical Agrarian government of Aleksandar Stamboliyski in place of compulsory military service, which had been prohibited under the Treaty of Neuilly-sur-Seine. All able-bodied Bulgarians, except those exempted for legitimate reasons and those who have served the state for more than three consecutive months, were required to serve either in the Regular service (eight months maximum for men between 20 and 40 years, four months for women between 16 and 30 years) or in the Temporary service up to 21 days a year. Labour service proved effective in carrying out post-war reconstruction through road and railway construction, manufacturing, agriculture and reforestation projects. From 1921 to 1936 a total of 313,669 "trudovaks" (labourers) were recorded as completing their compulsory service.

In the 1930s, as Bulgaria followed Germany in repudiating the military limitations imposed by the WW1 Paris peace treaties labour service was militarised. On 1 Jan 1935 it was renamed the labour corps (trudovi voiski) and jurisdiction was transferred from the Ministry of Public Works to the Ministry of Defence, with the establishment of military ranks in 1936. In 1938 with the signing of the Salonika Agreement Bulgaria was able to fully reinstate compulsory military service, reducing conscription to the labour corps.

However, in Jan 1941 the Law for Protection of the Nation came into effect, which required Jews to perform forced labour in lieu of military service and required that all Jews be treated as dangerous subversives. By order of the Bulgarian chief of the general staff, effective 27 January 1941, all Jews were removed from the regular armed forces. Military-aged Jewish conscripts were drafted in the labour corps and formed in Jewish labour units (trudovi druzhini). Jewish reservists who had already fulfilled their military or labour service were allocated as labour corps reservists.

After Bulgaria finally joined the Tripartite Pact on 1 March 1941 and became a base for German military operations against Yugoslavia and Greece repressive measures against the Jews increased. With a ministerial order on 29 Jan 1942 Jewish labour units were subordinated to the Temporary Labour Service of the Ministry of Public Works, depriving them of their military ranks and privileges.
Mandatory conscription applied from August 1941: initially men aged 20–44 were drafted, with the age limit rising to 45 in July 1942 and 50 a year later. The Jews in forced labour were faced with discriminatory policies which became stricter as time went on; with increasing length of service and decreasing the allowance of food, rest, and days off.

1941 

The first camps established expressly for Jewish forced labour were opened in spring 1941, with conscripts beginning their work on 1 May. The deployment was supposed to last five months and most were released on 1 October, but some were dismissed only in November. In 1941, under overall command of General-Major Anton Stefanov Ganev, the conditions were less harsh than in the subsequent three years, because of the infrastructure of the existing Bulgarian forced labour service and the traditional employment of minorities barred from carrying weapons as uniformed engineering auxiliaries in ethnically segregated units. Turks, Pomaks, and Romani men of military age were already drafted this way, and while second-class citizens, the compulsory work was not penal servitude. Labourers were not entitled to military insignia, but were issued uniforms and military boots and allowed medical treatment. In addition, in 1941 the army continued to classify Jewish junior officers and non-commissioned officers as "reservists" and allowed them uniforms suiting their rank and command over Jews of other ranks; this ended the following year. Nonetheless, the Jews were discriminated against; the upper age limit for labour duty was much higher for Jews than for Muslims, and unlike the Muslim draftees, the Jews were required to continue serving every year until they were either too old or unfit. Jews were detailed to do heavy construction work, while regulation practice was that in forced labour battalions (druzhina), all service personnelmedical, clerical, and signal staff, together with cooks and orderlieswere ethnic Bulgarians. Jewish labourers continued to be paid, though their wages were less than Bulgarians' were.

With Bulgaria not actively at war in 1941, the forced labourers were deployed on infrastructure projects, as they had been through the 1930s. In August 1941, at the request of Adolf-Heinz BeckerleGerman Minister Plenipotentiary at Sofiathe War Ministry relinquished control of all Jewish forced labour to the Ministry of Buildings, Roads, and Public Works. Throughout the year, propaganda and news of German victories intensified antisemitism in Bulgaria, both against the labourers and their families, and expulsion or extermination of the Jews was openly advocated. That summer, Generalmajor Konstantin Hierl, head of the Reich Labour Service (Reichsarbeitsdienst), visited Bulgaria. A command from the labour corps headquarters in Sofia forbidding Jewish conscripts to take photographs regarded as "military" came on 28 October 1941, a sign the Jews' situation was worsening, and in 1942 the treatment of Jews in forced labour became far harsher.

1942 

From 1942 all Jews were entirely denied military status, whether officers, NCOs, or other ranks. Administration of Jewish forced labour was transferred to the civilian Ministry of Public Works or OSPB (Ministerstvo na obshtestvenite sgradi, pŭtishtata i blagoustroistvoto), within which a new "Bureau of Temporary Labour" or OVTP (Otdel vremenna trudova povinnost) was set up, and forced labour units of Jews, Turks, ethnic Serbs, and "unemployed" (that is, Roma) were attached to new OVTP labour battalions. The word "temporary" in the OVTP's name presaged the genocide planned for them. On 29 January 1942, new all-Jewish forced labour battalions had been announced; their number was doubled to twenty-four by the end of 1942. Jewish units were separated from the other ethnicitiesthree quarters of the labour battalions were from minorities: Turks, Russians, and residents of the territories occupied by Bulgariathe rest were drawn from the Bulgarian "unemployed".

Military vocabulary was eschewed: each labour "battalion" (druzhina) was renamed "detachment" (otryad); "companies" were renamed "work groups" (trudovi grupi), each divided into "sections" (yadrovi). Forced labourers were no longer issued boots or uniforms, and had to work in civilian clothes and shoes unsuited to hard wear and extremes of weather in marshes and mountainsides; Jewish labourers were furthermore required to wear yellow badges. Nonetheless, military control over the labour battalions continued, because the government's "twin goals of somehow motivating the Jews to achieve results on construction projects, while simultaneously humiliating, robbing, beating, and undernourishing them, constituted a dilemma. A purely civilian entity lacked the means for resolving it." The Jewish company command structure of 1941 was considered too lenient towards desertion to conscripts' families in nearby cities. From 1942, Bulgarians replaced Jews in the commands of the Jewish labour units; Jewish former officers and NCOs were demoted to the ranks. In command was Polkovnik Nikola Halachev, with Polkovnik Ivan Ivanov and Podpolkovnik Todor Boichev Atanasov under him as inspectors.

Both Halachev and Atanasov displayed undisguised antisemitism. On 14 July 1942 Halachev announced new strictures: inveighing against desertion and failures to report for duty, he ordered that a punishment detachment be set up to work through the winter on a new railway line to Sidirokastro (Demir-Hisar) in occupied Greece. On the same day, deprivation of mattresses or of hot food, a "bread-and-water diet", and the barring of visitors were authorized. Visits, leave, letters and packages could be denied for three months at a time, while warm food could be withheld or bread and water rations imposed for ten consecutive days, mattresses denied for twenty days, and blankets denied indefinitely. Any of these punishments could be imposed concurrently. Confinement to the brig was to be avoided as a punishment and these measures allowed work to continue while deprivation was enforced. A week afterwards, on 22 July, Halachev again railed against the Jews in a memorandum, castigating desertion and malingering in the infirmaries; he then forbade Jews from visiting settlements near their work sites, on the pretext that they might be able to communicate using the post office. On 15 September, Halachev banned Jewish conscripts from meeting their wives and required that food parcels Jews received had to be shared among the units.

A new tax confiscating most Jews' liquid assets was imposed summer 1942, along with the duty of all Jews to wear yellow badges. In August 1942, the Commissariat for Jewish Affairs was created and began to register the Jewish populations of Bulgarian territory, including the occupied lands, in preparation for their deportation into Nazi hands, organized since February by the Commissioner Belev. The OVTP was not, however, informed of the Commissariat's plans, and it continued to plan its construction timetables on the assumption that its Jewish work force would be available for work in the 1943 season.

1943 
On 4 February 1943 Belev had recommended to the Council of Ministers that "swift measures" be taken to ensure the Jewish men working as forced labourers would not escape. His Commissariat for Jewish Affairs planned the destruction of Bulgaria's Jews before the end of the year. In the course of 1943 nearly all Jews in Bulgaria were incarcerated in prisons, camps, or ghettos. As the war progressed, and round-ups of Jews began in 1943, Jews made more numerous efforts to escape and punishments became increasingly harsh. Halachev was replaced in command of the forced labour corps by Polkovnik Tsvetan Mumdzhiev. Under him were his inspectors Podpolkovnik Cholakov and Podpolkovnik Rogozarov. Mumdzhiev had commanded military labourers in 1940, during the acquisition of South Dobruja, and in 1941 Rogazarov had been commander of the 1st Jewish Labour Battalion and was known to be humane towards conscripts. At the end of March 1943, some Jewish labourers who had been doctors or pharmacists were seconded to the military districts to prevent a shortage of medical skills.

The work season mandated for conscripts began earlier than before, with some forced labourers summoned before the end of January. Jews of conscription age in occupied Macedonia were not called up, however, and remained at home while others travelled to their work sites. Mumdzhiev in February sought to eradicate the widespread practice of extorting bribes from prisoners for the granting of home leave. The divergence in policy between the OVTP and the Jewish Affairs Commissariat grew in the spring; Mumdzhiev granted, in accordance with standard army procedures compassionate leave to many Jewish forced labourers, on the grounds their families' looming expulsion from Bulgaria constituted a family emergency. Many also deserted without leave to see their families, but even deserters remained under the OVTP's jurisdictionunlike all the rest of Bulgaria's Jews, the Commissariat of Jewish Affairs had no control over the OVTP's forced labourers (or those in prison and directly under Interior Ministry control), and they were thus near-immune from deportations organized by Belev. In occupied Thrace, male Greek Jews were conscripted in 1943, but their families were deported to Bulgaria and thence to Treblinka. Asked to intervene on behalf of these homeless Jews by the Jews of his native city of Plovdiv, Mumdzhiev issued indefinite furlough documents, rather than their seasonal leave papers, at the end of the work season and "several dozen" Jews were thus shielded from the Jewish Commissariat's purview.

Jews forced to work on the new railway between Krupnik and Sidirokastro were expected to continue work until 15 December, though in the event Mumdzhiev ordered in October that the ill-equipped Jews be allowed to stop working on 15 November. Others working at Lovech were only dismissed in early December. It is not known when or if the instructions of Belev on increased security at the camps were passed to the OVTP, but it appears they were not implemented. Jewish forced labourers deserted much more often than those from other ethnicities, as most of their families had been evicted from their homes and were now restricted to transit camps and temporary ghettos to await deportation from Bulgaria; Jewish men often returned with cash their families had given them in fear of impending deportation. Although by 1944 the effective danger of deportation had passed, this was not known to the Jews, who continued to fear imminent deportation. In the winter of 1943–1944, the Jewish labourers were released from work to the temporary transit camps and ghettos established by the Commissariat for Jewish Affairs, rather than to their homes, from which most of their families were evicted earlier in 1943.

1944 
The war was now against Germany, and the increasing successes of partisans in Bulgarian territory worsened friction between Jews and their Bulgarian overseers. Mumdzhiev's attempts to alleviate conditions at the forced labour camps was unevenly adhered to, and the dispositions of individual camp commanders towards the Jews led to varying levels of abuses. The forced labourers were again deployed to work camps mostly building motorways and roads. By autumn, the approach of the Red Army was the catalyst for mass desertions from the labour camps: by 5 September one Jewish unit lost 20% of its labourers and by 9 September, fewer than 20% were left and the feldfebel in command appealed in vain for the police in Plovdiv to arrest the deserters. Slowly, the Jewish forced labourers returned to their former hometowns, along with the residents of the ghettos. The general in command of the forced labour deployments, Polkovnik Tsvetan Mumdzhiev was a defendant in the People's Court Panel VII Holocaust trial, but petitions in his favour from labourers caused his acquittal.

Labour Service 
The Law for Protection of the Nation creates precedents and inconsistencies with other Bulgarian laws, including the Law on Military Forces. Many Jews who have been assigned to the military have to be released from service. They return to their homes and freely indulge in their peacetime activities. The Civilian Mobilization Directorate in a report recommends the Jews, that had to be recruited in the military to be redirected to the state Labor Forcea special branch, established in 1920, militarised in 1940 and existing until 2000. Shortly after this report, a special ordinance was promulgated governing the service of the Jews in the army, which stipulates that they will be called up for employment under the Military Forces Law. They were recruited in companies in which along the soldiers, can serve sergeants and officers with Jewish descent. They are recruited to do their regular labour service and the ones called for training have all the obligations and rights set out in the 1936 Disciplinary Code for Employment. To this end, Major-General Anton Ganev, the Chief of the Labor Force, issues an order defining the structure and composition in terms of the recruited for training and service, as well as the mobilised ranks. In an complementary order from 18 April 1941 Gen. Ganev points out that the relations with the Jews must be based on strictly established legal norms. Having in mind that most of the recruited Jews have not used on physical work they were required to meet at least 50% of the norm in the first week, 66% in the second, 75% in the third and from the third to work in accordance with the established standards. The Jewish workers have all the obligations and enjoy all the rights that the Bulgarian workers have. With an order from 14 July 1941 Gen. Ganev defines their salary, and with another order the sergeants and officers from Jewish descent get 15 days home leave in August and September 1941.

On 29 January 1942 the Minister of Defence of Bulgaria issues a new ordinance regarding the service of citizens of Jewish origin, according to which their military service in Labour Force is replaced with labour service at the Ministry of Public Buildings, Roads and Public Works. It retained the mechanism for engaging Bulgarian Jews to protect them from the escalation of their persecution by engaging in the Labor Force system, giving additional flexibility to the entire system of parrying the external pressure on the Jewish issue. The Jews that were found unfit for work were released from duty. During the autumn and winter the groups were released and the labour soldiers returned to their homes, so they can come to work at the next spring.

In his diary the Prime Minister Bogdan Filov, after meeting with Tsar Boris on April 13, 1943, noted: "We then spoke on the Jewish issue. The Tzar thinks that we should take the able-bodied into working groups and thus avoid sending the Jews from the old borders to Poland. In his secret letter to the Legation Counselor Eberhard von Thadden, the police attaché Adolf Hoffmann at the German Embassy in Sofia on May 17, 1943 wrote: "The Bulgarian government too transparently uses the labor force of the Jews solely as a pretext against our desired deportation of the Jews, the purpose of which is to evade it."

Ghettos 

Between early 1943 and late 1944 nearly all Bulgaria's surviving Jews were confined involuntarily to ghettos and transit camps as well as to the labour camps and prisons. After the protests of Dimitar Peshev and a sit-in at the office of Petar Gabrovski prompted the deferment of plans for the extermination of the remaining 8,000 Jews of the Belev-Dannecker agreement, Commissioner for Jewish Affairs Alexander Belev drew up new plans for the deportations of all Jews to be completed by September 1943. Sofia, home to half of the Jewish population, was the greatest logistical problem, and Belev arranged for a survey of vacant schools and Jewish residences throughout the provinces to determine where deportees from Sofia might be forcibly billeted in the homes of local Jews to form temporary transit ghettos before their final expulsion from Bulgaria; no consideration was given to spatial adequacy. In addition to the existing transit camps at Gorna Dzhumaya (Blagoevgrad) and Dupnitsa, another was planned at the existing internment camp at Somivit, the Danube port from where, as well Lom, Jews would be embarked on boats to transport the victims upriver out of Bulgaria. Belev had chartered six steamships for the Jews' journey and they waited in the Danube ports. Families were to be deported together, but without the working age men, who were deployed at the forced labour camps.

The first evictions were those from Sofia and Kazanlak, whose deported Jews were distributed to the temporary ghettos as planned. Their belongings were seized and the property inventoried and sold at auction by the Jewish Affairs Commissariat. Sofia's Jews were expelled from the 24 May 1943 and were deported to Berkovitsa, Burgas, Byala Slatina, Dupnitsa, Ferdinand, Gorna Dzhumaya, Haskovo, Karnobat, Kyustendil, Lukovit, Pleven, Razgrad, Ruse, Samokov, Shumen, Troyan, Varna, Vidin, and Vratsa. Some were also sent to Stara Zagora, but were shortly afterwards expelled again and dispersed elsewhere on the orders of the Bulgarian Army, which operated a base there and objected to the Jews' presence in the city. The Jews' billets in the residences of local Jews operated as so-called open ghettos, within which Jews were confined by specific movement restrictions and a general and punitive curfew. Jews were banned from public amenities, were allowed outdoors for only a few hours a day, could not leave their assigned towns at all, and were forbidden to engage in any commerce. Jews were barred from living together with non-Jews, "Jewish residences" (Evreisko zhilishte) had to be marked as such, and Jewish people had to mark themselves with yellow badges. The tight curfew was intended to keep the Jews concentrated to facilitate their eviction en masse at short notice, but because the ghettoization was intended to be temporary, the Jewish Affairs Commissariat did not formulate permanent ghetto restrictions centrally; instead it was the Commissariat's local "delegate", the municipal governments, and the police that were responsible for the varied ghetto policies imposed in each town. According to the Encyclopedia of Camps and Ghettos, the spring deportations' postponement left the Jewish population "in limbo — demoted to an untouchable subcaste status, penniless, uprooted, and removed from the body politic, yet not expelled beyond the country’s borders".

The authority of Belev's Commissariat did not extend to non-Jews, and in consequence, it was unable to fully segregate the Jewish and non-Jewish populations by evicting non-Jews from areas deemed ghettos, which would have provoked opposition, since the Jews were invariably billeted in the older and more ethnically mixed districts, usually neighbourhoods of low-grade tenement housing. Neither did the Commissariat's powers enable it to construct physical barriers between Jews and non-Jews to create closed ghettos. The word ghetto was not used officially; the euphemistic "Jewish Quarter" (evreiski kvartal) was applied instead.

Reception and legacy

The world's first Holocaust trial was held in Bulgaria in early 1945. Earlier wartime trials of had punished war criminals and others, but the "hastily convened" People's Court Panel VII tried 64 Bulgarian officials for crimes committed in the enforcement of the pro-Axis Bulgarian government's policies against the Jews as part of the Final Solution. The court was formed on the initiative of the Fatherland Front's Jewish committee. Unlike the later Nuremberg trials, and despite radical change to a communist-led government, the court's decisions were based on the pre-existing Bulgarian criminal code. Although this legitimized the new state, it made prosecutions for complicity in the mass murders itself difficult, because the regime had created the legal framework within which the crimes were lawful, like the 1940 Law for the Protection of the Nation and the 1942 decree-law. Instead, prosecutions were mainly for "incidental malfeasance" and convictions were hard to secure. Now fighting with the Soviets against the Nazis, the Bulgarian Army tried to shield from liability officers who had abused Jewish forced labourers and lawyers engaged in the liquidation of Jews' assets mostly escaped sanction. Most defendants were acquitted or received lenient penalties and most offenders were never charged. Two death sentences were handed down, including one for Alexander Belev, but he had already died in 1944 and was tried in absentia. Shortly afterwards, records of the People's Court Panel VII trial were suppressed, including the "abundant testimony", and secreted, unpublished, in the exclusive archives of the communist People's Republic of Bulgaria's Interior Ministry. Until the end of the Cold War, they were seldom cited.

The post-war People's Republic, in accordance with communist principles, compared the survival of most of Bulgaria's wartime Jewish population to the rescue of the Jews from Nazi-occupied Denmark in 1943. State-controlled historiography attributed the survival to principled and righteous popular action by the Bulgarian people inspired by the then-outlawed Bulgarian Communist Party in 1943. The fate of the Jews of Macedonia and Thrace was "simply ignored", by which means "the narrative cast Bulgaria alongside Denmark as a nation of rescuers, even exceeding that Scandinavian country in the percentage of Jews saved". One work to make the comparison was Haim Oliver's We Were Saved: How the Jews in Bulgaria Were Kept from the Death Camps, published in Bulgarian and in English in 1967. Most of Bulgaria's surviving Jews emigrated soon after the war, joining the global Aliyah. Some Jews who stayed in the country were committed Communists that assisted in spreading the story of the 'rescue' through various media including articles in the state-controlled Sofia Jewish organization's annual volume Godishnik, and a small museum in Sofia. A publication by the Bulgarian Academy of Sciences in 1978 was typicalit was entitled: The Struggle of the Bulgarian People for the Defence and Salvation of the Jews in Bulgaria during the Second World War.

After the November 1989 fall of Communism in Bulgaria, the fate of Bulgaria's Jews remained "a cornerstone of national pride" and "an unassailable historiographic a priori". Historiographical debate focused on who should be credited with responsibility for the early 1943 'rescue'. The Tsar, the Church, and the legislators led by Dimitar Peshev all joined the Communists among those to whom responsibility was being apportioned.

In reaction to the view promulgated officially by Communist Bulgarian state, a dissenting view emerged that Tsar Boris was not an antisemite or a convinced Nazi-sympathizer and should be credited with the Jews' survival. Binyamin Arditi, an Israeli politician of Bulgarian Jewish origin and sometime chair of the pre-war Zionist Organization of Bulgaria in Sofia, published The Role of King Boris in the Expulsion of Bulgarian Jewry in 1952. The view that Boris had ordered the deportations was repeated in the first major academic account of the events outside Bulgaria, the 1972 The Bulgarian Jews and the Final Solution, by Frederick B. Chary. Both Bulgarian writer Stephan Groueff's 1987 Crown of Thorns: The Reign of King Boris III of Bulgaria and Israeli politician Michael Bar-Zohar's 1998 Beyond Hitler’s Grasp: The Heroic Rescue of Bulgaria’s Jews also took this view. The perspective favouring the Tsar was also useful to his son and briefly heir as Tsar Simeon II of Saxe-Coburg-Gotha. During his tenure as Prime Minister of Bulgaria under the name Simeon Sakskoburggotsk, a 2003 resolution in the United States Congress honoured Bulgaria's saving of the Jews.

By contrast, in Israel controversy arose in 2000 over a memorial to Tsar Boris at Yad Vashem in Jerusalem. A specially convened panel of jurists concluded there was historical evidence that showed Boris had personally approved the deportations of his Jewish subjects; the memorial in the Tsar's name was removed.

In 2008, Bulgarian President Georgi Parvanov on a visit to Israel said Bulgaria accepted responsibility for the genocide of Jews deported from its jurisdiction. He said: "when we express justifiable pride at what we have done to save Jews, we do not forget that at the same time there was an anti-Semitic regime in Bulgaria and we do not shirk our responsibility for the fate of more than 11,000 Jews who were deported from Thrace and Macedonia to death camps".

The role of Dimitar Peshev, recognized as Righteous Among the Nations by Yad Vashem, was emphasized by Italian journalist of Bulgarian Jewish heritage Gabriele Nissim in his 1998 L’uomo che fermò Hitler ["The Man Who Stopped Hitler"]. His petition of 17 March 1943 was inspired by Jewish residents in his constituency, who were ultimately not exterminated on the same timetable as Jews outside the 1940 borders of Bulgaria as planned but were nonetheless deported from Kyustendil for ghettos in the countryside. Tzvetan Todorov highlighted Peshev's role in 1999 using excerpts of Peshev's post-war diary in La fragilité du bien: le sauvetage des juifs bulgares ["The Fragility of Good: the Rescue of the Bulgarian Jews"]. After the judgement reached in 2000 in Israel on the culpability of Boris III for the massacre of the Macedonian and Thracian Jews, Todorov's book's English translation was released in 2001 with the subtitle's wording changed to Why Bulgaria's Jews Survived the Holocaust.

Also in 1999, Nissim's work L’uomo che fermò Hitler appeared in Bulgarian translation, published with assistance from the Bulgarian National Assembly. Subsequently, official commemoration of Peshev intensified. Statues, postage stamps, and other honours followed. In 2002, the Dimitar Peshev House-Museum was inaugurated in Kyustendil, Peshev's home town, to commemorate his life and actions to prevent the deportation of Bulgarian Jews during the Holocaust. In 2013, a street intersection outside the Bulgarian embassy in Washington, DC was named Dimitar Peshev Plaza. This move was opposed by the United States Holocaust Memorial Museum; the antisemitic Law for the Protection of the Nation was supported by Peshev in the winter of 1940-'1.

In 2002, the synod of the Bulgarian Orthodox Church published protocols (later translated into English and entitled The Power of Civil Society in a Time of Genocide: Proceedings of the Holy Synod of the Bulgarian Orthodox Church on the Rescue of the Jews in Bulgaria, 1940-1944) emphasizing the role its members played in the Bulgarian Jews survival, a perspective less politically fraught than praise of the Tsar. Proponents advocate the award of a corporate Nobel Peace Prize to the Church, in spite of a paucity of evidence that Church statements and the imprecations of the Metropolitans of Sofia and Plovdiv were heeded or anything other than dismissed by Boris.

March 10, 2016 – the 73rd anniversary of the rescue – was commemorated in Bulgaria as Holocaust Memorial Day.

A monument of gratitude for the rescue of Bulgarian Jews from the Holocaust was dedicated in the presence of the Israeli Ambassador and other dignitaries in Bourgas, Bulgaria, 75 years after the rescue of the Bulgarian Jews and the deportation of Jews from areas of northern Greece and Yugoslavia under Bulgarian administration.

The rescue of the Bulgarian Jews has been feted by some historians, including Bulgarians and Jews alike, as a remarkable act of heroic defiance, while some other historians describe it as an "eleventh hour" episode of cynical opportunism that occurred due to the desire for favourable treatment if and when the Nazis lost the war, noting the much less rosy fate of Jews in Macedonia and Thrace, while still others take a middle position.

In popular media
In 2012, The Third Half, a Macedonian-Czech-Serbian movie about Macedonian football during World War II, and the deportation of Jews from Yugoslav Macedonia presented through the real-life story of Neta Koen, a Holocaust survivor, was shortlisted as the country's entry for Best Foreign Language Oscar at the 85th Academy Awards, but it did not make the final cut for nomination.

Bibliography

 
 
 
 
 Ioanid, Radu (2010) "Occupied and Satellite States." P. Hayes & J. K. Roth (eds.) The Oxford Handbook of Holocaust Studies. Oxford: Oxford University Press.
 
 
 
 "Bulgaria", United States Holocaust Memorial Museum, Holocaust Encyclopedia, https://encyclopedia.ushmm.org/content/en/article/bulgaria
 The power of the civil society: Proceedings of the Holy Synod of the Bulgarian Orthodox Church on the Rescue of the Jews in Bulgaria (1940-1944), Sofia, 2005, The Sofia University Center for Jewish Studies, Sofia University Press St. Kliment Ohridski,

See also
 History of the Jews in Bulgaria
 Rescue of the Danish Jews
 The Holocaust
 History of Jews
 Nazi war crimes

References

External links
 aishcom website
 Newpol website
 Holocaustresearchproject website
 shalom website

 
Jews and Judaism in Bulgaria
Bulgaria in World War II
1943 in Bulgaria